Luxi County is a county of Hunan Province, China. It is under the administration of Xiangxi Autonomous Prefecture.

Located on the western part of Hunan and the south eastern Xiangxi, the county is bordered to the northeast by Yuanling County, to the southeast by Chenxi County, to the south by Mayang County, to the southwest by Fenghuang County, to the northwest by Jishou City and Guzhang County. The county has 7 towns  and 4 townships under its jurisdiction, the county seat is Wuxi.

Climate

References
www.xzqh.org

External links 

 
County-level divisions of Hunan
Xiangxi Tujia and Miao Autonomous Prefecture